Fisher's Station, also known as Carriage Point, was a stage stand on the old Butterfield Overland Mail route and the Texas Road in Indian Territory. It was located at the head of Island Bayou in what is now Bryan County, Oklahoma. Island Bayou was then the dividing line between the Chickasaw and Choctaw Nations. From March 23, 1869, to February 6, 1871, the Carriage Point post office existed at the site and it is generally referred to by that name in the area. The Fishers were a well known Choctaw family.

Fisher's Station (Carriage Point) was added to the National Register of Historic Places (#72001058) in 1972.

References

Sources
Shirk, George H. Oklahoma Place Names. Norman: University of Oklahoma Press, 1987:  .
Wright, Murial H.; George H. Shirk; Kenny A. Franks. Mark of Heritage. Oklahoma City: Oklahoma Historical Society, 1976.
Wright, Muriel H. "The Butterfield Overland Mail One Hundred Years Ago", Chronicles of Oklahoma 35:1 (January 1957) 55-71 (accessed August 19, 2006).

Buildings and structures in Bryan County, Oklahoma
Butterfield Overland Mail in Indian Territory
National Register of Historic Places in Bryan County, Oklahoma
Stagecoach stations in Oklahoma
Stagecoach stations on the National Register of Historic Places in Oklahoma